This is a list of lists of replicas of various specific objects.
 List of Eiffel Tower replicas
 Independence Hall replicas
 Replicas of the Jewish Temple
 Replicas of Michelangelo's David
 Replicas of Michelangelo's Pietà
 Mona Lisa replicas and reinterpretations
 List of replicas of Noah's Ark
 Replicas of the Statue of Liberty
 Stonehenge replicas and derivatives
 Replicas of the White House